Tossal Gros de Miramar, or simply Tossal Gros, is a mountain of the Catalan Pre-Coastal Range, Catalonia, Spain. It has an elevation of 866.6 metres above sea level.

This mountain is the highest summit of the Serra de Miramar; it is located between the municipal limits of Figuerola del Camp, in the Alt Camp comarca, and Montblanc, Conca de Barberà.

See also
Catalan Pre-Coastal Range
Mountains of Catalonia

References

Mountains of Catalonia